The 2013–14 season was AEL Kalloni's first season in the Super League Greece, the top flight of Greek football. They also participated in the Greek Cup.

Club

Coaching staff

Kit

|
|
|
|
|
|
|
|

Other information

Competitions

Overall

Last updated: 13 April 2014

Pre-season

The first phase of the preparation started on July 1. From July 17 to 29, the team went over to Pinzolo, Trentino, Italy, where the basic stadium of the preparation took place.

Super League Greece

League table

Results summary

Results by round

Matches

1.Because of the delay in completion of improvement works on Mytilene Municipal Stadium, they had to play their home matches in neutral stadiums.

Greek Cup

Second round

AEL Kalloni won 4–3 on aggregate.

Third round

OFI won 2–1 on aggregate.
1.Because of the delay in completion of improvement works on Mytilene Municipal Stadium, they had to play their home matches in neutral stadiums.

Players

Squad statistics

Statistics accurate as of 13 April 2014.

Transfers

Summer

In

Loaned in

Out

Winter

In

Loaned in

Out

Loaned out

Infrastructure leagues

U20

Pos = Position; Pld = Matches played; Pts = Points

U17

First round

Pos = Position; Pld = Matches played; Pts = Points

Second round

Pos = Position; Pld = Matches played; Pts = Points

References 

2013-14
Greek football clubs 2013–14 season